The Year's Best Science Fiction: Twenty-Sixth Annual Collection is a science fiction anthology edited by Gardner Dozois that was published on June 23, 2009.  It is the 26th in The Year's Best Science Fiction series.

Contents
The book includes 30 stories, all that were first published in 2008. The book also includes a summation by Dozois, a two-paragraph introduction to each story by Dozois and a referenced list of honorable mentions for the year. The stories are as follows:
Stephen Baxter: "Turing's Apples"
Michael Swanwick: "From Babel's Fall'n Glory We Fled"
Paolo Bacigalupi: "The Gambler"
Elizabeth Bear and Sarah Monette: "Boojum"
Alastair Reynolds: "The Six Directions of Space"
Ted Kosmatka: "N-Words"
Ian McDonald: "An Eligible Boy"
Dominic Green: "Shining Armour"
Karl Schroeder: "The Hero"
Mary Robinette Kowal: "Evil Robot Monkey"
Robert Reed: "Five Thrillers"
Jay Lake: "The Sky That Wraps the World Round, Past the Blue and Into the Black"
Paul McAuley: "Incomers"
Greg Egan: "Crystal Nights"
Mary Rosenblum: "The Egg Man"
Hannu Rajaniemi: "His Master's Voice"
Charles Coleman Finlay: "The Political Prisoner"
James L. Cambias: "Balancing Accounts"
Maureen F. McHugh: "Special Economics"
Geoff Ryman: "Days of Wonder"
Paul McAuley: "The City of the Dead"
Gwyneth Jones: "The Voyage Out"
Daryl Georgy: "The Illustrate Biography of Lord Grimm"
Kristine Kathryn Rusch: "G-Men"
Nancy Kress: "The Erdmann Nexus"
Garth Nix: "Old Friends"
James Alan Gardner: "The Ray-Gun: A Love Story"
Gord Sellar: "Lester Young and the Jupiter's Moons' Blues"
Aliette de Bodard: "Butterfly, Falling at Dawn"
Ian McDonald: "The Tear"

Release details
 2009, United States, St. Martin's Press , Pub date June 2009, Hardcover 
 2009, United States, St. Martin's Griffin , Pub date June 2009, Trade paperback 
 2009, United States, St. Martin's Griffin , Pub date June 2009, ebook

References

External links
 
 Review of volume, with summaries of varying length

2009 anthologies
26
St. Martin's Press books